Ryan Semple may refer to:

Ryan Semple (footballer, born 1977), Northern Irish football player for Peterborough United, Derry City, Linfield and Institute FC
Ryan Semple (footballer, born 1985), English football player for Peterborough United, Lincoln City and Corby Town
Ryan Semple (skier) (born 1982), Canadian alpine skier